The 1950–51 season was Aberdeen's 39th season in the top flight of Scottish football and their 41st season overall. Aberdeen competed in the Scottish League Division One, Scottish Cup, and the Scottish League Cup.

Results

Division A

Final standings

Scottish League Cup

Group 4

Group 4 final table

Knockout stage

Scottish Cup

References

AFC Heritage Trust

Aberdeen F.C. seasons
Aber